John Lyall (16 April 1881 – 17 February 1944) was a Scottish footballer who played as a goalkeeper.

Career
Born in Dundee but raised on Tyneside,  Lyall played club football for Jarrow, Sheffield Wednesday, Manchester City and Dundee, and made one appearance for Scotland in 1905.

He made 295 appearances in all competitions for Wednesday and won the Football League title twice (1902–03, 1903–04) and the FA Cup once (1907) during his eight years with them.

He made 44 appearances in all competitions for Manchester City and won the Second Division title in 1909–10 during his time with them.

Personal life
Lyall served as a corporal in the Royal Engineers during the First World War and was deployed in India. He later emigrated to the United States.

References

1881 births
1944 deaths
Scottish footballers
Scotland international footballers
Footballers from Tyne and Wear
Sportspeople from Jarrow
Anglo-Scots
Jarrow F.C. players
Sheffield Wednesday F.C. players
Manchester City F.C. players
Dundee F.C. players
English Football League players
Sheffield Wednesday F.C. wartime guest players
Association football goalkeepers
Footballers from Dundee
Scottish emigrants to the United States
Ayr United F.C. players
British Army personnel of World War I
Royal Engineers soldiers
FA Cup Final players